The Alchemist's Question is a novella by British fantasy and science fiction writer Michael Moorcock. It is part of his long running Jerry Cornelius series. It was also published in his collection The Opium General and other stories and the compilation The Cornelius Chronicles, Vol. III.

1984 British novels
1984 science fiction novels
Novels by Michael Moorcock
British novellas